Feyzabad (also Romanized as Feyẕābād and Faizābād; also known as Faiz Abadé Jarghooyeh) is a village in Ramsheh Rural District, Jarqavieh Olya District, Isfahan County, Isfahan Province, Iran. At the 2006 census, its population was 76, in 30 families.

References 

Populated places in Isfahan County